Robert Büchi (born 1910) was a Swiss footballer who played for St. Gallen and FC Basel during the 1930s. He played as defender

Until 1933 Büchi played for St. Gallen. He joined Basel's first team during their 1932–33 season. He played his domestic league debut for the club in the home game at the Landhof on 10 September 1933 as Basel won 3–0 against La Chaux-de-Fonds. He scored his first and only league goal for his club on 13 September 1936 in the away game against Nordstern Basel as Basel won 3–1.

Between the years 1933 and 1939 Büchi played a total of 99 games for Basel scoring that one goal. 72 of these games were in the Nationalliga, six in the Swiss Cup and 21 were friendly games.

References

Sources
 Rotblau: Jahrbuch Saison 2017/2018. Publisher: FC Basel Marketing AG. 
 Die ersten 125 Jahre. Publisher: Josef Zindel im Friedrich Reinhardt Verlag, Basel. 
 Verein "Basler Fussballarchiv" Homepage

FC Basel players
Swiss men's footballers
Association football defenders
1909 births
Year of death missing